Argolamprotes is a genus of moths in the family Gelechiidae.

Species
Argolamprotes micella (Denis & Schiffermüller, 1775)

References

Isophrictini
Moth genera